Threes Anna (pseudonym of Threes Schreurs, born in Vlaardingen, The Netherlands, 1959) is a novelist, theatre and film maker.

Biography

Threes Anna is trained as a visual artist. In 1985, Anna was engaged in theatre company Dogtroep, specialized in site specific theatre. In 1989, she becomes artistic leader of the company. Under her leadership, Dogtroep creates over fifty performances all over the world. The performances are developed into big visual spectacles with an international cast. Owing to the extent and complexity of the shows, she doesn't perform herself from 1993 onwards, and concentrated on script writing and directing. Apart from her theatre work, she creates and produces documentaries about several different artists and Dogtroep. After a tragic accident in 1998, in which her partner in life and colleague Marco Biagioni dies, Threes Anna stops with Dogtroep and begins to develop feature films and writing novels.

Since 2003 Threes Anna has published seven novels, De kus van de weduwe ('The Widow's Kiss'), Motormoeder ('Motor Mother', the very first Dutch novel to be downloaded and read on mobile phone), De stille stad ('Silent City'), Vogel kan niet vliegen ('The Bird Can't Fly', after her first feature film), Wachten op de moesson ('Waiting for the Monsoon') (foreign rights were sold before publication to Italia (Mondadori), Spain (MAEVA), Germany (Insel) and Canada (Anansi), Het laatste land ('The Last Land') in 2012 and Paradijsvogel in 2016.

In 2007 Threes Anna's feature film debut, The Bird Can’t Fly is released on the international market, an English spoken full-length movie, that she wrote, directed, and co-produced. The American actress Barbara Hershey has the leading role, the rest of the cast and crew is south-African. The movie had its première at the San Sebastian International Film Festival and won several prizes. In 2012 her second feature film is launched: Silent City (based on her novel De stille stad), playing in Japan. In 2014 her short film Platina Blues, 40 minutes in one hand-held shot, on the composition of the same name by Dutch rock star Thé Lau, is launched.
In September 2020, Threes Anna launched the feature The Warden (de Vogelwachter) a one-actor-movie with the 75-year-old Dutch comedian Freek de Jonge in the lead.

Prizes 
Threes Anna's film debut The Bird Can't Fly won these prizes:
Filmprijs van de stad Utrecht for the best movie debut 
the Stimulans voor Succes Prijs for the most successful films in artistic and commercial ways
the Jury's Special Award on the Sofia IFF
the best film and best director at the Zimbabwe IFF
the best film at the Internazionale del Film di Roma
the best script at the Madrid-Móstoles IFF.

Works

Literature 

 Paradijsvogel (novel) 2016
 Het laatste land (novel) 2012
 Wachten op de moesson (novel) 2010
 Vogel kan niet vliegen (novel) 2008
 De stille stad (novel) 2006
 Motormoeder (novel) 2005
 De kus van de weduwe (novel) 2003

Film 
 The Warden (de Vogelwachter) a one actor feature film.
 Platina Blues 2014 (40 minutes one-shot film, made on the music and text of Thé Lau)
 Silent City 2012 (feature film, international co-production The Netherlands, Luxembourg and Belgium)
 The Bird Can’t Fly 2007 (feature film, international co-production The Netherlands, South-Africa and Ireland)
 Noordwesterwals 1996 (short film, co-directed by Boris Pavel Conen)

Documentary 

 Portret of Maarten 2003
 De Wals 1996
 Theatre in South Africa 1994

Theatre 

 1998 Hotazel – outdoor spectacle – tournee The Netherlands
 1998 2ROOM2 – performance on location – Das Arts Amsterdam
 1997 Stille Getuigen – performance on location – Diepenheim
 1997 Adder Zonder Gras – performance on location – Groningen
 1997 A1 – reisvoorstelling – South-Africa
 1997 Stemlab – laboratoriumvoorstelling – Amsterdam 
 1996 Kulhavy Tango – performance on location – Archa Theatre Prague Czech Republic
 1996 Dynamo Mundi – performance on location – Carré Amsterdam
 1996 Sturm+Stahldraht – performance on location – WMG Gelände Unna Germany
 1996 Trekpleisters – laboratorium show – Amsterdam 
 1995 theatrical concert – Paradiso Amsterdam
 1995 Assimil 2 – BITEF festival – Belgrade Serbia
 1995 Noordwesterwals 2 – performance on location – Amsterdam
 1995 Assimil 1 – performance on location co-production KPTG – Subotica Serbia
 1993/1994 New Year's Eve spectacle- live TV show
 1994 Arts Alive – performance on location – Johannesburg South-Africa
 1994 Noordwesterwals – performance on location – Amsterdam
 1994 Camel Gossip III – performance on location opening Skyline Theatre – Chicago USA
 1993 Liebes Lied – opening Buchmesse – Frankfurt Germany
 1993 Uwaga Uwaga II – outdoor spectacle – Tilburg
 1993 Uwaga Uwaga I – outdoor spectacle – Torun Poland
 1993 Camel Gossip II – performance on location – Schram Studio Amsterdam 
 1992 Camel Gossip I – performance on location – Tramway Glasgow Scotland
 1992 Special Event – birthday Sonja Barends – live TV show 
 1992 Waterwork – performance on location – World Expo Sevilla Spain
 1992 Waterwork – performance on location – Zoetermeer
 1992 La tête d’eau – performance on location Olympic Games Albertville France
 1991/1992 – New Year's Eve spectacle- live TV show
 1991 Gestolen Titels – performance on location – Praag Czechoslovakia
 1991–1993 l’Ascension du Mandarin – traveling show – Europe and Uzbekistan
 1991 Broederstrijd – outdoor spectacle – Oerol-festival
 1991 Special – outdoor spectacle – Neu Brandenburg DDR
 1991 Special – outdoor spectacle – Lille France
 1991 Vliegtuigje – live TV show
 1991 outdoor spectacle – Haarlem 
 1991 The Man – outdoor spectacle – Mainz Germany
 1990/1991 New Year's Eve spectacle– Nieuwmarkt Amsterdam 
 1990 NO-W-All – outdoor spectacle – co-production with Licedei – Berlin Germany
 1990 Ente II – outdoor spectacle – Chieri Italy
 1990 Ente I – outdoor spectacle – Grenoble France
 1990 De springmachine – outdoor spectacle – tour The Netherlands
 1990 Vingers Branden – performance on location – Korenbeurs Groningen
 1990 outdoor spectacle – Oerol-festival
 1989 De Ton – indoor spectacle- Rotterdam 
 1989 Non Inventions – outdoor spectacle – summer tour The Netherlands
 1989 Cow Girls – outdoor spectacle – tour Italy
 1989 BiZa – special project – Den Haag 
 1989 De tuin – performance on location – Neerpelt Belgium 
 1989 Zigeunerwereld – indoor show – tour The Netherlands
 1989 performance on location – Sheffield England
 1989 Zoutloper –outdoor spectacle – Eemnes and Utrecht
 1989/1990 – New Year's Eve spectacle – Nieuwmarkt Amsterdam 
 1988 – opening disco Fellini – Utrecht 
 1988 Infiltrations – tour The Netherlands
 1988 Wit Paard – outdoor spectacle – Leffinge Belgium
 1988 Siësta – outdoor spectacle – Sabadell Spain

References

External links
 
Website Threes Anna
Movie The Bird Can’t Fly
Movie Silent City

1959 births
Living people
21st-century Dutch novelists
Dutch women novelists
People from Vlaardingen
Dutch women film directors
Dutch documentary filmmakers
21st-century Dutch women writers
Women documentary filmmakers
Pseudonymous women writers
21st-century pseudonymous writers